Edwin Williams may refer to:
Edwin Williams (American football) (born 1986), American football offensive lineman
Edwin Williams (rugby) (1898–1983), rugby union and rugby league footballer of the 1920s
Edwin Williams (footballer) (1868–?), Welsh international footballer who played for Crewe Alexandra F.C.
Edwin A. Williams (1847–1920), American politician
Edwin Ross Williams (born 1942), physicist
Edwin S. Williams (born 1948), American linguist
Ed Williams (linebacker) (born 1961), American football linebacker
Dib Williams (Edwin Dibrell Williams, 1910–1992), American second baseman and shortstop in Major League Baseball

See also

Edward Williams (disambiguation)